Nuno Rodrigues may refer to:

 Nuno Rodrigues (footballer, born 1979), Portuguese football left back
 Nuno Rodrigues (footballer, born 1994), Portuguese football midfielder